Adele is an English singer-songwriter. After signing a contract with record label XL Recordings in September 2006, Adele began to work on her debut studio album, 19, which was ultimately released in 2008. At this time, the singer contributed guest vocals on the song "My Yvonne" for Jack Peñate's debut studio album Matinée (2007). The first single released from 19 was "Chasing Pavements", which Adele wrote in collaboration with Eg White. They co-wrote two other songs for the album: "Melt My Heart to Stone" and "Tired". She also collaborated with Sacha Skarbek on the single "Cold Shoulder" and recorded a cover version of Bob Dylan's "Make You Feel My Love". However, most of the songs were written solely by Adele, including "Best for Last", "Crazy for You", "First Love", and "My Same", as well as her debut single, "Hometown Glory".

Adele appeared as a featured artist on another song by Peñate, entitled "Every Glance", from his second studio album, Everything Is New, and on Daniel Merriweather's "Water and a Flame" from his second studio album, Love & War, both released in 2009. Adele released her second studio album 21 in 2011. In addition to reuniting with writers with whom she had previously worked, the singer collaborated with several new writers and producers. The album's lead single, "Rolling in the Deep", was co-written by Adele and Paul Epworth. It has since been certified eight-times platinum by the Recording Industry Association of America (RIAA) and won two awards at the 54th Grammy Awards: Record of the Year and Song of the Year. Adele and Epworth also wrote "He Won't Go" and "I'll Be Waiting". Adele collaborated with Dan Wilson on the album's second single, "Someone Like You". She co-wrote with Fraser T Smith on "Set Fire to the Rain" and with Ryan Tedder on "Rumour Has It" and "Turning Tables". She reunited with White on the song "Take It All". Adele released "Skyfall" in October 2012, a song co-written with Epworth for the James Bond film of the same name. Her third album, 25, was released in 2015. Adele co-wrote its songs "I Miss You" and "Sweetest Devotion" with Epworth and co-wrote "Hello", "Million Years Ago", and "Water Under the Bridge" with Greg Kurstin.

In 2021, Adele announced her fourth studio album 30, scheduled for release on 19 November 2021. The album release was preceded with the single "Easy on Me", co-written with Greg Kurstin.

Songs

References

External links
List of Adele songs at AllMusic

 
Adele